Public holidays in Croatia are regulated by the Holidays, Memorial Days and Non-Working Days Act.

* In 2020 there was a change in holidays: June 25 (was Statehood Day until 2019, became Independence Day in 2020) and October 8 (was Independence Day until 2019, became Day of the Croatian Parliament in 2020) changed names and were demoted from public holidays to memorial days (working). May 30 (was Day of the Croatian Parliament until 2019, became National Day in 2020) was promoted from a memorial day to a public holiday, and November 18 (Remembrance Day) was added as a new public holiday.

Note: Citizens of the Republic of Croatia who celebrate different religious holidays have the right not to work on those dates. Christians who celebrate Christmas, Easter and Easter Monday per the Julian calendar, Muslims on the days of Ramadan Bayram and Kurban Bayram, and Jews on the days of Rosh Hashanah and Yom Kippur.

Unofficial holidays
Popular carnival celebrations are held in most cities and towns in the country on Shrove Tuesday (Pokladni utorak), when customarily businesses in public sector and hospitality industry cease work for the day earlier than usual, but the day is not officially designated a public holiday.
Some cities also celebrate de facto public holidays on their patron saints' feast days. For example, in Split, the day of Saint Domnius (Sveti Duje) is celebrated on May 7, while Dubrovnik marks the day of Saint Blaise (Sveti Vlaho) on 3 February ; business usually cease work earlier than usual on these days. Most of rural village parishes in Slavonia celebrate their patron saints' with kirbaj / kirvaj festival (from German kirche weihe) when schools are usually closed for a day.
Even though Christmas Eve (24 December ), New Year's Eve (31 December), and Good Friday are not public holidays, businesses customarily close earlier (as early as 12pm).

References

 
Modern history of Croatia
Croatian culture
Society of Croatia
Croatia
Holidays